The Rotters' Club is the second album by the English Canterbury scene rock band Hatfield and the North, released in March 1975. It was also in part an inspiration for the 2001 novel of the same name by Jonathan Coe.

Track listing

Notes: The first two are abridged versions of those on the original release of The Rotters' Club. "Halfway Between Heaven and Earth" was first released on "Over the Rainbow" – a various artists live album. This version is slightly shorter, the introduction is cross-faded with the preceding track. The last two tracks were first released on Afters.

Personnel 
 Phil Miller – guitar
 Dave Stewart – Fender Rhodes electric piano, Hammond organ, Minimoog, acoustic piano, tone generator
 Richard Sinclair – bass guitar, lead vocals; guitar (7)
 Pip Pyle – drums
 Jimmy Hastings – saxophone (5 & 9), flute (6–8 & 9)
 Barbara Gaskin, Amanda Parsons, Ann Rosenthal – backing vocals (6 & 9)
 Tim Hodgkinson – clarinet (3 & 5)
 Lindsay Cooper – bassoon (3 & 5)
 Mont Campbell – French horn (3 & 4)

References

1975 albums
Hatfield and the North albums
Virgin Records albums